Heleobia parchappii is a species of small freshwater snail, an operculate gastropod mollusk in the family Cochliopidae.

Distribution
Argentina and Uruguay.

Ecology
Parasites of Heleobia parchappii include trematode Lobatostoma jungwirthi.

References

External links

Cochliopidae
Gastropods described in 1835